Douglas Blair Peterson (July 25, 1945 – June 26, 2017) was an American yacht designer. Beginning with the One Tonner Ganbare in 1973, Peterson's designs have pioneered many innovations in racing and cruising yachts.

In the mid-1970s, Peterson's designs dominated offshore racing events, with a string of winning high-profile IOR boats. Designed for Jack Kelly Yachts, the Peterson 44 debuted in 1976. This boat was a pioneer in performance cruising yacht design and one can still see many of the over 200 built in ports around the world.  The design was followed by the Kelly Peterson 46 of which 30 were built. Hull number 30, the last one built, completed a circumnavigation of the globe in 2017. Also the Liberty 458 and the Delta 46 were based on this design. In the same period, he designed five sailboats, for the English yard Jermey Rogers, the Contessa 28, 35, 39 and 43 as well as the OOD34.

Designed 'Deception' One Tonner launched in 1978 with Fractional rig and fixed keel, won her division in the 1978 Sydney to Hobart yacht race and placed eighth overall. Also designed ‘Streaker’ one tonner launched several years earlier, which also won her division and placed fourth overall in the same 1978 race.

In the early 1980s Hans Christian Yachts commissioned him to design their 48 and 52 Christina models. "I have designed the Christina 52 to have great speed with a very comfortable motion and it is designed as a pure cruising boat."

Peterson later entered the America's Cup circle as a key design member of the winning 1992 America and 1995 NZL 32 Black Magic Team New Zealand design teams. In 2000, Peterson designed the winning Louis Vuitton Cup boat for Prada Challenge.

Peterson died on June 26, 2017, in San Diego, California after a long battle with cancer, aged 71, shortly after the Kelly Peterson 46 Esprit finished her fourteen year circumnavigation.

Designs
Chaser 29
Islander 40
Ganbare 35
Legende 1 Ton
Seaway 25
Sun Fast 41
Sun Legende 41
Triton 27
Triton 30
US Yachts US 27
US Yachts US 29
US Yachts US 30
US Yachts US 33

References

1945 births
2017 deaths
Doug Peterson (yacht designer)
People from Los Angeles